Josiah Little Pickard (March 17, 1824 – March 28, 1914) was the Superintendent of Public Instruction of Wisconsin, 1860–1864, and the sixth President of the University of Iowa, 1878–1887.

Born in Rowley, Massachusetts, Pickard grew up on a farm near Brunswick, Maine and went to Lewiston Falls Academy in Maine. He graduated from Bowdoin College in 1844. In 1845, he moved west and then moved to Wisconsin, in 1864, and was principal of Platteville Academy now University of Wisconsin–Platteville. From 1860 until 1864, Pickard was Superintendent of Public Instruction of Wisconsin. During that time he was on the University of Wisconsin Board of Regents.

In 1864, he resigned as Superintendent of Public Instruction and moved to Chicago, Illinois to be head of the public school system, a job he began in June of that year. He served until resigning in June 1877 (he alleged that the school board had forced him out in order to appoint his assistant superintendent Duane Doty, which Doty denied).

Finally, he went to the University of Iowa and served as President until his retirement in 1887. He also was President of the State Historical Society of Iowa. After 1889, he retired and from 1900, Pickard lived in retirement with his daughter in Cupertino, California.

Pickard died at his daughter's home in Cupertino after falling from a streetcar and breaking his leg. He was buried in Chicago.

Notes

People from Cupertino, California
People from Rowley, Massachusetts
People from Brunswick, Maine
People from Chicago
People from Platteville, Wisconsin
Bowdoin College alumni
Educators from Illinois
Educators from Wisconsin
Superintendents of Public Instruction of Wisconsin
Presidents of the University of Iowa
1824 births
1914 deaths
19th-century American politicians
Superintendents of Chicago Public Schools
American school principals